Villarino de los Aires is a large municipality in the province of Salamanca, western Spain, part of the autonomous community of Castile-Leon. It is located in the very north of the province and as of 2016 has a population of 869 people.

Geography
The municipality covers an area of 103 km².

It lies 605 meters above sea level and lies on the River Duero.

See also
List of municipalities in Salamanca

References

Municipalities in the Province of Salamanca